John Pettus may refer to:

 John Jones Pettus (1813–1867), U.S. politician
 Sir John Pettus (c. 1640-1698), 3rd Baronet of the Pettus Baronetcy
 John Pettus (MP for Norwich), Member of Parliament for Norwich 1604–1611
 John Pettus (courtier), (c. 1613-1685), elected Fellow of the Royal Society